This is a list of ironclads of the Royal Navy of the United Kingdom. An ironclad was a steam-propelled warship in the early part of the second half of the 19th century, protected by iron or steel armour plates.

The term battleship was not used by the Admiralty until the early 1880s, with the construction of the Colossus class. Prior to this point, a wide range of descriptions were used.

While the introduction of the ironclad is clear-cut, the boundary between 'ironclad' and the later 'pre-dreadnought battleship' is less obvious, as the characteristics of the pre-dreadnought evolved. For the sake of this article, the Royal Sovereign-class are treated as the first pre-dreadnoughts on account of their high freeboard and mixed battery of guns.

Glossary
 BU = broken up
 In the sections listing warships in the English/Royal Navy from 1860 onwards, the dates have been quoted using the modern convention of the year starting on 1 January.

Sea-going ironclads (1860–1888)
  broadside ironclads
 Warrior (1860) - Preserved Portsmouth
 Black Prince (1861) - Renamed Emerald 1903, renamed Impregnable III 1910, sold for BU 1923
  broadside ironclads
 Defence (1861) - Renamed Indus 1898; hulked 1922; sold for BU 1935
 Resistance (1861) - Sold 1898; foundered 1899; raised and BU
  broadside ironclads
 Hector (1862) - Sold for BU 1905
 Valiant (1863) - Renamed Indus 1898, Valiant (Old) 1916, and Valiant III 1919; became floating oil tank 1924; BU 1957
 Achilles (1863) broadside ironclad — Renamed Hibernia 1902, Egmont 1904, Egremont 1918, and Pembroke 1919; sold for BU 1925
  broadside ironclads
 Minotaur (1863) - Renamed Boscawen 1904, Ganges 1906, and Ganges II 1908; sold for BU 1922
 Agincourt (1865) - Renamed Boscawen III 1904 and Ganges II 1906; became coal hulk C109 1908; sold for BU 1960
 Northumberland (1866) - Renamed Acheron 1904; became coal hulk C 1909, renamed C68 1926; sold 1927; became hulk Stedmound, BU 1935
  broadside ironclads (converted from Bulwark class 2-deckers)
 Prince Consort (1862) (ex-Triumph) - Sold for BU 1882
 Caledonia (1862) - Sold for BU 1886
 Ocean (1862) - Sold for BU 1882
 Royal Oak (1862) broadside ironclad (converted from Bulwark class 2-decker) - Laid up 1871; sold for BU 1885
 Royal Alfred (1864)  central-battery ironclad (converted from Bulwark class 2-decker)- Sold for BU 1885
 Research (1863) central-battery ironclad — Sold for BU 1884
 Enterprise (1864) central-battery ironclad — Sold for BU 1886
 Favorite (1864) central-battery ironclad — Sold for BU 1886
 Zealous (1864)  central-battery ironclad (converted from Bulwark class 2-decker) - Laid up 1875; sold for BU 1886
 Repulse (1868)  central-battery ironclad (converted from Bulwark class 2-decker) - Sold for BU 1889
  broadside ironclads
 Lord Clyde (1864) - Sold for BU 1875
 Lord Warden (1865) - BU 1889
 Pallas (1865) central-battery ironclad — Sold for BU 1886
 Bellerophon (1865) central-battery ironclad — Renamed Indus III 1904; sold for BU 1922
 Penelope (1867) central-battery ironclad — Hulked 1897; sold for BU 1912
 Hercules (1868)  central-battery ironclad — Renamed Calcutta 1909 and Fisgard II 1915; sold for BU 1932
 Monarch (1868) masted turret-ship — Renamed Simoom 1904; sold for BU 1905
 Captain-class masted turret-ship
 Captain (1869) - Foundered 1870
   central-battery ironclads
 Audacious (1869) - Renamed Fisgard 1904 and Imperieuse 1914; sold for BU 1922
 Invincible (1869) - Renamed Erebus 1904 and Fisgard II 1906; foundered under tow 1914
 Iron Duke (1870) - Hulked 1900; sold for BU 1906
 Vanguard (1870) - Sunk in collision 1875
  central-battery ironclads
 Swiftsure (1870) - Hulked 1901; renamed Orontes 1904; sold for BU 1908
 Triumph (1870) - Renamed Tenedos 1904, Indus IV 1912, and Algiers 1912; sold for BU 1921
 Sultan (1870)  central-battery ironclad — Named Fisgard IV 1906-1931; sold for BU 1946
  mastless turret-ship
 Devastation (1871) - Sold for BU 1908
 Thunderer (1872)  mastless turret-ship — Sold for BU 1909
 Alexandra (1875)  central-battery ironclad — Sold for BU 1908
 Temeraire (1876)  central-battery ironclad with barbettes — Renamed Indus II 1904 and Akbar 1915; sold for BU 1921
 Superb-class (intended for Ottoman Empire)  central-battery ironclads
Superb (launched as Hamidieh, renamed) (1875) - Sold for BU 1906
 (Ottoman Messudieh)
 Neptune (1874) (ex-Independencia)  masted turret-ship — Sold for BU 1903
 Dreadnought (1875)  mastless turret-ship — Sold for BU 1908
 Inflexible (1876) central citadel turret-ship — Sold for BU 1903
  central citadel turret-ships
 Agamemnon (1879) - BU 1903
 Ajax (1880) - Sold for BU 1904
  turret-ships
 Colossus (1882) - Sold for BU 1908
 Edinburgh (1882) - BU 1910
  mastless turret ships
  (1882)
  (1884)
  (1885)
  (1885)
  (1886)
  (1885)
  mastless turret ships
  (1887)
  (1887)
  mastless turret ships
  (1887)
  (1888)

Coastal service ironclads
 Royal Sovereign (1862) turret-ship (converted from Duke of Wellington class 3-decker) - Sold for BU 1885
 Prince Albert (1864) turret-ship — Sold for BU 1899
  masted turret-ships
 Scorpion (1863) - Sunk as target 1901; raised and sold for BU 1903; foundered en route scrapyard 1903
 Wivern (1863) - Sold for BU 1922
  turret-ships
 Cerberus (1868) (Victoria) - Renamed Platypus II 1918; sunk as breakwater 1926
 Magdala (1870) (India) - Sold for BU 1904
 Abyssinia (1870) (India) turret-ship — Sold for BU 1903
 Hotspur (1870) turret-ship — Sold for BU 1904
 Glatton (1871) turret-ship — Sold for BU 1903
  turret-ships
 Cyclops (1871) - Sold for BU 1903
 Gorgon (1871) - Sold for BU 1903
 Hecate (1871) - Sold for BU 1903
 Hydra (1871) - Sold for BU 1903
 Rupert (1872) turret-ship — Sold for BU 1907
  (intended for Ottoman Empire) central battery ships
 Belleisle (launched as Peki-Shereef, renamed) (1876) -Sold for BU 1904
 Orion (planned name: Boordhi-Zaffer) (1879) - Renamed Orontes 1909; sold for BU 1913
  turret-ships
 Conqueror (1881) - Sold for BU 1907
 Hero (1885) - Sunk as target 1908; raised and BU

See also
 List of ironclads
 List of breastwork monitors of the Royal Navy

Sources
 Ballard, Admiral G.A.   The Black Battlefleet,  published Nautical Publications Co. and Society for Nautical Research, 1980.  
 Chesnau, Roger and Kolesnik, Eugene (Ed.) Conway's All the World's Fighting Ships 1860–1905. Conway Maritime Press, 1979. 
 Gardiner, Robert (Ed.). Conway's All the World's Fighting Ships 1906–1921. Conway Maritime Press, 1985. 
 Chesnau, Roger and Gardiner, Robert (Ed.) Conway's All the World's Fighting Ships 1922–1946. Conway Maritime Press, 1980. 
 Lyon, David and Winfield, Rif, The Sail and Steam Navy List, All the Ships of the Royal Navy 1815–1889, pub Chatham, 2004, 
 Parkes, Oscar   British Battleships, first published Seeley, Service & Co., 1957, published United States Naval Institute Press, 1990.  
 Reed, Edward J   Our Ironclad Ships, their Qualities, Performance and Cost. John Murray, 1869.

Ironclads
Royal Navy